Doug Stone is a voice actor who is best known for providing the English voice of Psycho Mantis from the popular video game Metal Gear Solid, as well as the voice of Matt Trakker and several other characters in M.A.S.K., and Dragonborg in Beetleborgs Metallix.

Filmography

Anime dubbing

 .hack//Liminality – Guard D
 Ai Yori Aoshi – Aoi's Father
 Arc the Lad – Ambassador, Dernitas, George, Soldier
 Argento Soma – Dr. Ernest Noguchi
 Armitage III – Lowell Gantz
 Black Magic M-66 – Major
 BlazBlue Alter Memory – Valkenhayn R. Hellsing
 Blue Dragon – General Orehill
 Boruto: Naruto Next Generations – Victor
 Boys Be... – Furata
 Carried by the Wind: Tsukikage Ran – Tonto Sharakusai
 Chobits – Tetsuya Ohmura
 Code Geass: Lelouch of the Rebellion – Noble (Ep. 1), Kusakabe (Ep. 5, 7 & 8)
 Cosmo Warrior Zero – Chief, Soldier A
 Cowboy Bebop – Van
 Daphne in the Brilliant Blue – Tsutomu Hanaoka
 DearS – Gen, Oihiko's Father, Principal
 Detatoko Princess – Jii, Innkeeper, Topaz's Henchman
 Devadasy – Tech
 Digimon Data Squad – Director Hashima
 Dirty Pair: Affair of Nolandia – Shuttle Pilot, Taxi Driver
 Durarara!! – Shingen Kishitani, Shojiro Kitokoma
 El Hazard: The Alternative World – Allujah
 Ergo Proxy – Al, Berkeley, Hoody, Petro Seller
 Eureka Seven – Stoner
 Fafner in the Azure – Mr. Kasugai, Mitsuhiro Bertrand
 Fena: Pirate Princess – Otto
 Figure 17 – Sho's Father
 Gad Guard – Arashi's Father, Curator, Fergus, Man in Bed, Man on Street, News Reporter
 Gankutsuou: The Count of Monte Cristo – Danglars
 Ghost in the Shell: Stand Alone Complex – Matsuoka (ep 10)
 Ghost Slayers Ayashi – Kumoshichi, Master, Yukiwa
 Girls Bravo – Old Customer A (Ep. 14), Vegetable Store Keeper (Ep. 2)
 Great Teacher Onizuka – Police Officer A, Taxi Driver
 Grenadier – Hage's Thug
 Gundress – Mayor, Spike
 Gungrave – Jester, Older Police Officer, Bob Poundmax, Parker
 Gun Frontier – Conductor (Ep. 10), Dr. Surusky, Innkeeper
 Gun Sword – Elle and Earl's Father (Ep. 5), Priest
 Gurren Lagann – Dayakka, Guame
 Heat Guy J – Master Serge Echigo
 Hello Kitty's Paradise – Various
 Hellsing Ultimate – Sir Hugh Islands
 Honeybee Hutch – Various
 Iczer-One – Police Man
 Japan Sinks: 2020 – Kunio Ashida
 JoJo's Bizarre Adventure – Wang Chan, Mario Zeppeli
 Jungle de Ikou! – Dad, TV Announcer
 Kamichu! – God of Kickboard (Ep. 7)
 Karas: The Prophecy – Detective Minoru Sagisaka
 Kekkaishi – Hisui
 Kill La Kill – Mitsuzo Soroi, Principal Bonda (Ep. 1)/ Sōichirō Kiryūin/Isshin Matoi
 Koi Kaze – Zenzo Saeki
 Kyo Kara Maoh! – Raven
 Last Exile – Various
 Lensman – Lekesly, Patrol Captain
 Magical Girl Pretty Sammy – Male Scientist
 Magic Knight Rayearth – Innkeeper, Geo Metro (Season 2)
 Mahoromatic: Something More Beautiful – Canan-Model Android
 Mao-chan – Galaxy the Great, Prime Minister
 Maple Town – Additional Voices
 March Comes In like a Lion - Hanaoka, Arimoto
 Mars Daybreak – O'Connell
 Melody of Oblivion – Teacher
 Mermaid Forest – Toba Islander
 Metal Fighter Miku – Kozo Shibano, Nagoya Shibano
 Mezzo Forte – Bodyguard A, Tagami, Urinal Guy
 Mirage of Blaze – Nobunaga Oda (Ep. 11) Punk (Ep. 8), Yasuhide Tohyama
 Mobile Suit Gundam: The Origin – Jimnba Ral
 Monster – Hess, Ivan Kurten, Mr. Buchner, Bergbach, Mr. Hertz, Mustafa, Schone, Zoback
 Moldiver – Professor Hitoshi Amagi/Dr. Machinegal
 Moribito: Guardian of the Spirit – Gakai, Chamberlain
 Naruto – Fugaku Uchiha, Teyaki Uchiha
 Naruto Shippuden – Fugaku Uchiha, Gerotora, Teyaki Uchiha, Kosuke Maruboshi (Ep. 190, 239)
 New Getter Robo – Lab Staff
 New Gigantor – Bob Brilliant
 Ninja Robots – Various
 Noozles – Additional Voices
 One-Punch Man - Dr. Kuseno
 Orguss 02 – King Mendez
 Otogizōshi – Taroumaru (ep 5)
 Outlanders – Emperor
 Outlaw Star – Swanzo
 Panda! Go, Panda! – Various
 Paranoia Agent – Akio Kawazu
 Phoenix – General, Kimihiro, Oguma, Tonku, Village Mayor
 Planetes – Philippe Myers
 Please Teacher! – Principal Tendo
 R.O.D the TV – Cafe Owner (Ep. 7), Detective (Eps. 1,7), Editor A (Ep. 10), John Smith (Ep. 7), Shop Owner C (Ep. 3), Staff B (Ep. 8), Ushida
 Rave Master – Let
 Requiem from the Darkness – Yasaku (Ep. 3)
 Resident Evil: Infinite Darkness – Wilson
 Rumiko Takahashi Anthology – Doctor, Hazuki's Father, Male Guest, Toshio
 Rurouni Kenshin – Geo, Pirate, Shura's Father, Toshimichi Okubo
 Saber Marionette J Again – Gennai
 Saiyuki Gunlock – Taizou's Father
 Saiyuki Reload – Souryu
 Samurai Champloo – Prison Guard, Villager #2, Yagyu Member #3
 Scrapped Princess – Roy (Ep. 9-10)
 S-CRY-ed – Councilman, Guard, Newscaster, Promoter, Relief Worker, Subordinate C
 The Seven Deadly Sins – Old Knight
  Shaman King - Yohmei Asakura
 Shinzo – Various
 Space Pirate Captain Harlock – Professor Daiba, Minister's Aide, Officer, Crewmember
 Spirit of the Sword – Ukyo
 Strait Jacket – Fahgo
 Street Fighter II V – Customs Inspector (Animaze dub), Masters Corp. Rep. (Animaze dub)
 Sword Art Online – Nishida
 Sword Gai: The Animation - Doctor, Tokumitsu
 Tenchi in Tokyo – Azaka
 Tenchi Muyo! Ryo-Ohki – Azaka (OVA 3)
 Tengen Toppa Gurren Lagann – Dayakka, Guame
 Tenjho Tenge – Tetsu
 Texhnolyze – Promoter
 The Twelve Kingdoms – Chikan Officer, Kakugo, Masashi Nakajima, Matsuyama
 The Wicked and the Damned: A Hundred Tales of Karma - Yasaku (ep. 3)
 Tokko – Kaoru Kunikida
 Vampire Princess Miyu – Genta, Man, Policeman
 Wild Arms: Twilight Venom – Dad
 Witch Hunter Robin – Muroi, Shintaro Kosaka
 Wowser – Various
 Yukikaze – Karl Gunow (Ep. 2)
 X – Additional Voices
 Zenki – Bonze Jukai
 Zillion – J.J.

Animation
 All-New Dennis the Menace – Additional Voices
 Chucklewood Critters – Lester, Skeeter
 Conan the Adventurer – Additional Voices
 The Return of Dogtanian – Porthos
 The Easter Chipmunk – Various
 Iznogoud – Various
 M.A.S.K. – Matt Trakker, Bruce Sato, Dusty Hayes, Hondo MacLean, Boris "The Czar" Bushkin, Bruno Sheppard, Nash Gorey, Maximus Mayhem
 Walter Melon – Don Diego
 Wisdom of the Gnomes – Klaus
 Lego Friends

Live-action
 Beetleborgs Metallix – Dragonborg (voice)
 Dynamo Duck – Conrad Crud, Rupert Flybreath, Dr. Know (voice)
 Power Rangers Lost Galaxy – Skelekron (voice)

Dubbing of foreign shows in English

Films
 Akira – Council Member
angel wars guardian force paladin 2004/2009
 Appleseed – Elders, Operator
Arthur's Missing Pal - TV Detective
 Black Jack The Movie – Charles Rosen
 Cats Don't Dance – Additional Voices
 Cowboy Bebop: The Movie – Analyzer
 Cromartie High – The Movie – Actor 2, Electrician, Gori, Noburo Yamaguchi
 Eureka Seven -good night, sleep tight, young lovers – Stoner 
 Fist of the North Star – Torture Victim
 Fly Me to the Moon – Russian Newscaster
 Ghost in the Shell 2: Innocence – Lin
 Godzilla: Planet of the Monsters — Halu-Elu Dolu-do
 Godzilla: City on the Edge of Battle - Halu-Elu Dolu-do
 Godzilla: The Planet Eater - Halu-Elu Dolu-do 
 Happily N'Ever After 2: Snow White—Another Bite @ the Apple – McHugh
 Kiki's Delivery Service – Driver 1, Hotel Receptionist, Bakery Customer 1 (Streamline Dub)
 Kite Liberator – Doctor
 Leroy & Stitch – Ensign Getco
 Lilo & Stitch – Ensign Getco
 Mobile Suit Gundam (Movies 1–3) – Gihren Zabi
 Mobile Suit Gundam F91 – Gruce Erras
 My Neighbor Totoro – Searcher 1, Mailman (Streamline dub) (uncredited)
 Naruto the Movie: Ninja Clash in the Land of Snow – Buriken
 Osmosis Jones – Police Officer with big germ, Jamie the police officer of Frank Police Department
 Sakura Wars: The Movie – Ikki Yoneda
 The Swan Princess: A Royal Family Tale – Speed
 The Swan Princess Christmas – Speed
 The Swan Princess II: Escape from Castle Mountain – Speed
 The Swan Princess: The Mystery of the Enchanted Kingdom – Speed
The House of Magic – Lawrence 
 Tenchi Muyo! in Love – GP Commander, High School Coach
 Tenchi Forever! The Movie – Azaka
 Thumbelina: A Magical Story - Swallow, Mouse, Insect, Sea Creature, Turtle, Hobbit #1, Hobbit #3 (uncredited)
 The Wings of Honneamise – Noble, Reporter, TV Commentator
 Yu Yu Hakusho: The Movie – Winged Demon

Video Games
 Battlezone – Minor officer
 BlazBlue series –  Valkenhayn R. Hellsing
 Final Fantasy Crystal Chronicles: Crystal Bearers (Cid)
 Fire Emblem Echoes: Shadows of Valentia (Mycen)
 Fire Emblem: Three Houses (Gilbert Pronislav, Duke Aegir)
 Fire Emblem Warriors: Three Hopes (Gilbert Pronislav, Duke Aegir)
 Marvel vs. Capcom: Infinite (Dr. Light)
 Mega Man 11 (Dr. Light)
 Metal Gear Solid – Psycho Mantis
 Metal Gear Solid: Integral – Psycho Mantis
 Metal Gear Solid: The Twin Snakes – Psycho Mantis
 Metal Gear Solid 4: Guns of the Patriots – Psycho Mantis
 ParaWorld – Taslov
 Quest for Glory V: Dragon Fire – Abdull, Arestes, Gort, Ugarte, Wolfie
 Rave Master – Let Dahaka
 Star Trek: Judgment Rites – Cicissa, Jakesey, Schiller
 StarCraft II: Wings of Liberty - Edmund Duke
 The Space Adventure – Cobra: The Legendary Bandit – Cobra
 Tiny Toon Adventures: Buster and the Beanstalk – Additional Voices
 Xenoblade Chronicles X – Additional voices

Staff work
 Dynasty Warriors 4 - Producer
 Ghost in the Shell: Stand Alone Complex 2nd GIG - ADR Script
 Iczer-One - Director
 Idol Project - Walla Coach
 Jin Jin and the Panda Patrol - Writer, Producer, Voice Director
 Journey to the Heart of the World - Director
 The Jungle Book 2 - ADR Loop Group
 Little Mouse on the Prairie - Voice Director
 Mars Daybreak - ADR Script
 Mobile Suit Gundam: The Movie Trilogy - Director
 Mojave Moon - ADR Loop Group
 Orguss 02 - ADR Script
 Street Fighter II: The Animated Movie - Casting Director
 The Prince of Egypt - ADR Group
 The Return of Dogtanian - Director
 Shadow Ops: Red Mercury - Casting Director
 Tenchi in Tokyo - ADR Director
 Tenchi Muyo! in Love - ADR Director
 Tenchi Muyo! Daughter of Darkness - ADR Director
 Tenchi Muyo! Tenchi Forever - ADR Director
 Willy Fog 2 - Director
 Wisdom of the Gnomes - Director

Documentaries
 Adventures in Voice Acting - Himself

References

External links

Living people
Canadian male voice actors
Male actors from Toronto
Canadian male video game actors
Canadian casting directors
Canadian television writers
Canadian television directors
Canadian television producers
Canadian male television writers
Voice directors
Canadian expatriate male actors in the United States
Writers from Toronto
Year of birth missing (living people)